Roeland Park is a city in Johnson County, Kansas, United States, and located within the Kansas City metropolitan area.  As of the 2020 census, the population of the city was 6,871.

History
The Roe Home was built in 1891 and razed in 1958 to make room for the interchange at Roe Boulevard and Shawnee Mission Parkway.

Roeland Park's original pool was built in 1958 on land donated by the Roe Estate. The new pool facility is located on the east side of the Community Center at 4843 Rosewood Drive. The Community Center address is 4850 Rosewood Drive and offers many different programs throughout the year. A fabric dome which covers the main pool is in place from September to May, allowing residents to use the main pool throughout the year.

Geography
Roeland Park is located at  (39.034705, −94.639211).

Demographics

2010 census
As of the census of 2010, there were 6,731 people, 3,065 households, and 1,732 families living in the city. The racial makeup of the city was 87.6% White, 3.7% African American, 0.4% Native American, 1.5% Asian, 3.8% from other races, and 3.0% from two or more races. Hispanic or Latino of any race were 10.4% of the population.

There were 3,065 households, of which 26.6% had children under the age of 18 living with them, 42.2% were married couples living together, 10.4% had a female householder with no husband present, 3.9% had a male householder with no wife present, and 43.5% were non-families. 33.0% of all households were made up of individuals, and 7.7% had someone living alone who was 65 years of age or older. The average household size was 2.20 and the average family size was 2.82.

The median age in the city was 34.1 years. 20% of residents were under the age of 18; 8.4% were between the ages of 18 and 24; 36% were from 25 to 44; 24.5% were from 45 to 64; and 11.1% were 65 years of age or older. The gender makeup of the city was 48.4% male and 51.6% female.

2000 census
As of the census of 2000, there were 6,817 people, 3,007 households, and 1,798 families living in the city. The racial makeup of the city was 92.39% White, 1.97% African American, 0.45% Native American, 1.42% Asian, 0.10% Pacific Islander, 2.16% from other races, and 1.51% from two or more races. Hispanic or Latino of any race were 6.65% of the population.

There were 3,007 households, out of which 26.9% had children under the age of 18 living with them, 46.9% were married couples living together, 10.2% had a female householder with no husband present, and 40.2% were non-families. 32.5% of all households were made up of individuals, and 10.5% had someone living alone who was 65 years of age or older. The average household size was 2.27 and the average family size was 2.91.

In the city, the population was spread out, with 21.8% under the age of 18, 7.8% from 18 to 24, 35.5% from 25 to 44, 21.1% from 45 to 64, and 13.8% who were 65 years of age or older. The median age was 36 years. For every 100 females, there were 91.5 males. For every 100 females age 18 and over, there were 86.7 males.

The median income for a household in the city was $51,455, and the median income for a family was $61,750. Males had a median income of $40,504 versus $32,212 for females. The per capita income for the city was $26,220. About 3.0% of families and 5.2% of the population were below the poverty line, including 6.5% of those under age 18 and 4.4% of those age 65 or over.

Education
The city is a part of the Shawnee Mission School District.

Roesland Elementary School, St. Agnes Elementary School and Bishop Miege High School are located in the city.

Libraries
The Johnson County Library serves residents of Roeland Park. The library's Cedar Roe branch is in Roeland Park.

Notable people
Notable individuals who were born in and/or have lived in Roeland Park include:
 John D. Carmack (1970- ), computer programmer, co-founder of video game company id Software
 Catherine Fox (1977- ), swimmer, winner of two gold medals at the 1996 Olympics in Atlanta, Georgia
 Mike Gardner (1967- ), football coach
 Nia Williams (1990- ), soccer defender
 Sharice Davids (1980- ), member of the United States House of Representatives from

References

Further reading

External links
 City of Roeland Park
 Roeland Park - Directory of Public Officials
 Roeland Park city map, KDOT

Cities in Kansas
Cities in Johnson County, Kansas
Kansas City metropolitan area
1951 establishments in Kansas